Dan Cruickshank's Adventures in Architecture is a BBC series first aired on BBC Two in April 2008 in which British architectural historian Dan Cruickshank travels around the world visiting what he considers to be the world's most unusual and interesting buildings, structures and sites. In Australia, the programme was broadcast on ABC1 from 28 May 2009.

Companion book

External links

2000s British documentary television series
2008 British television series debuts
2008 British television series endings
BBC television documentaries
Documentary television series about architecture
Documentary television series about art